Ushanovka is a rural locality (a selo) in Timiryazevskoye Rural Settlement, Novousmansky District, Voronezh Oblast, Russia. The population was 97 as of 2010.

Geography 
Ushanovka is located 29 km southeast of Novaya Usman (the district's administrative centre) by road. Krylovka is the nearest rural locality.

References 

Rural localities in Novousmansky District